Literary forgery (also known as literary mystification, literary fraud or literary hoax) is writing, such as a manuscript or a literary work, which is either deliberately misattributed to a historical or invented author, or is a purported memoir or other presumably nonfictional writing deceptively presented as true when, in fact, it presents untrue or imaginary information or content.

History 
Literary forgery may involve the work of a famous author whose writings have an established intrinsic, as well as monetary, value. In an attempt to gain the rewards of such a reputation, the forger often engages in two distinct activities. The forger produces a writing which resembles the style of the known reputable author to whom the fake is to be attributed. The forger may also fake the physical alleged original manuscript. This is less common, as it requires a great deal of technical effort, such as imitating the ink and paper. The forger then claims that, not only is the style of writing the same, but also that the ink and paper are of the kind or type used by the famous author. Other common types of literary forgery may draw upon the potential historical cachet and novelty of a previously undiscovered author.

Literary forgery has a long history. Onomacritus (c. 530 – 480 BCE) is among the most ancient known literary forgers. He invented prophecies, which he ascribed to the poet Musaeus.

In the 3rd century CE, a certain Septimius produced what appeared to be a Latin translation of an eyewitness account to the Trojan War by Dictys of Crete. In the letter of dedication, the translator gave additional credence to the document by claiming the Greek original had come to light during Nero's reign when Dictys' tomb was opened by an earthquake and his diary was discovered. Septimius then claimed the original had been handed to the governor of Crete, Rutilius Rufus, who gave the diary to Nero during his tour of Greece in 66-67 CE. According to historian Miriam Griffin, such bogus and romantic claims to antiquity were not uncommon at the time.

One of the longest lasting literary forgeries is by Pseudo-Dionysius the Areopagite, a 5th-6th century Syrian mystical writer who claimed to be a disciple of Paul the Apostle. Five hundred years later, Abelard expressed doubts about the authorship, but it was not until after the Renaissance that there was general agreement that the attribution of the work was false. In the intervening 1,000 years, the writings had much theological influence.

Thomas Chatterton (1752–1770), the English poet and letter writer, began his brilliant medieval forgeries when little more than a child. While they brought him praise, and fame after his death, his writing afforded little in the way of financial success and he committed suicide aged 17, penniless, alone and half-starved.

The English Mercurie appeared to be the first English newspaper when it was discovered in 1794. This was, ostensibly, an account of the English battle with the Spanish Armada of 1588, but was, in fact, written in the 18th century by Philip Yorke, 2nd Earl of Hardwicke, as a literary game with his friends.

Literary forgery was promoted as a creative method by Charles Nodier and, in the 19th century, many writers produced literary forgeries under his influence, notably Prosper Merimee and Pierre Louys.

The Protocols of the Elders of Zion is an antisemitic forged document first published in Russia in around 1903–1904.  The work purports to be details of a Jewish plan for world domination, and describes how Judaism will overthrow Christianity via control of the media, financial institutions, subverting the social order, and so on.  The document was exposed as a hoax by English journalist Philip Graves in 1921.  Graves showed the work drew as a source an 1864 political satire by Maurice Joly, The Dialogue in Hell Between Machiavelli and Montesquieu, except presenting it as real.  Similar exposes were published in other languages, but it did not matter; the Protocols were immensely popular among anti-semitic circles, who took it as proof of the evilness of the Jews.

The Hitler Diaries were an example of a 20th century forgery for money.  Konrad Kujau, an East German forger, created diaries purportedly written by Adolf Hitler.  His forgeries passed initial scrutiny enough for the magazine Stern to purchase them at great expense, but various errors and closer analysis revealed the fraud.  Kujau was sent to prison for fraud afterward.

Related issues

Fake memoirs

Some pieces' authors are uncontested, but the writers are untruthful about themselves to such a degree that the books are functionally forgeries - rather than forging in the name of an expert or authority, the authors falsely claim such authority for themselves.  This usually takes the form of autobiographical works as fake memoirs.  Its modern form is most common with "misery lit" books, in which the author claims to have suffered illness, parental abuse, and/or drug addiction during their upbringing, yet recovered well enough to write of their struggles.  The 1971 book Go Ask Alice is officially anonymous, but claims to be taken from the diary of an actual drug abuser; later investigation showed that the work is almost certainly fictitious, however.  A recent example is the 2003 book A Million Little Pieces by James Frey, wherein Frey claimed to experience fighting drug addiction in rehab; the claimed events were fictional, yet not presented as such.

Other forms considered literary hoaxes are when an author asserts an identity and history for themselves that is not accurate.  Asa Earl Carter wrote under the pseudonym Forrest Carter; Forrest Carter claimed to be a half-Cherokee descendent who grew up in native culture, but the real Asa Earl Carter was a white man from Alabama.  Forrest Carter's persona thus possessed a similar false authenticity as a forged work would, in both their memoir and their fiction.  Similarly, Nasdijj and Margaret Seltzer also falsely claimed Native American descent to help market their works.  Danny Santiago claimed to be a young Latino growing up in East Los Angeles, yet the author (whose real name was Daniel Lewis James) was a Midwesterner in his 70s.

Transparent literary fiction
Occasionally, it is unclear whether a work is fiction or a forgery.  This generally occurs when a work is written intended as a piece of fiction, but through the mouthpiece of a famous historical character; the audience at the time understands that the work is actually written by others imagining what the historical persona might have written or thought.  With later generations, this distinction is lost, and the work is treated as authoritatively by the real person.  Later yet, the fact that the work was not really by the seeming author resurfaces.  In the case of true transparent literary fictions, no deception is involved, and the issue is merely one of misinterpretation.  However, this is fairly rare.

Examples of this may include several works of wisdom literature such as the book of Ecclesiastes and the Song of Solomon in the Hebrew Bible.  Both works do not directly name an author, but are written from the perspective of King Solomon, and feature poetry and philosophical thoughts from his perspective that can switch between first and third-person perspectives.  The books may not have intended to be taken as actually from the hand of Solomon, but this became tangled, and many later generations did assume they were directly from Solomon's hand.  The fact that it is not clear if any deception was involved makes many scholars reluctant to call the work forgeries, however, even those that take the modern scholarly view that they were unlikely to have been written by Solomon due to the work only being quoted by others many centuries after Solomon's death.

For more disputed examples, some New Testament scholars believe that pseudepigrapha in the New Testament epistles can be explained as such transparent fictions.  Richard Bauckham, for example, writes that for the Second Epistle of Peter, "Petrine authorship was intended to be an entirely transparent fiction."  This view is contested.  Bart Ehrman writes that if a religiously prescriptive document was widely known to be not actually from the authority it claimed, it would not be taken seriously.  Therefore, the claim of authorship by Peter only makes sense if the intent was indeed to falsely claim the authority of a respected figure in such epistles.

See also 
 Anthony Godby Johnson
 B. Wongar
 Clifford Irving
 Dave Pelzer
 False document
 Ghostwriter
 Hitler Diaries
 Journalistic scandal
 JT LeRoy
 Outline of forgery
 Pseudepigrapha

References

Bibliography
 Bart D. Ehrman Forgery and Counterforgery: The Use of Literary Deceit in Early Christian Polemics, Oxford University Press, USA (2012) 978-0199928033 
 James Anson Farrer Literary Forgeries. With an Introduction by Andrew Lang, HardPress Publishing (2012) 
 Anthony Grafton Forgers and Critics: Creativity and Duplicity in Western Scholarship (Princeton: Princeton University Press, 1990) 
 Ian Haywood The making of history: a study of the literary forgeries of James Macpherson and Thomas Chatterton in relation to eighteenth-century ideas of history and fiction, Fairleigh Dickinson University Press, 1986, 
 Lee Israel Can You Ever Forgive Me?: Memoirs of a Literary Forger Simon & Schuster; 1st edition (2008)
 Melissa Katsoulis Telling Tales: A History of Literary Hoaxes (London: Constable, 2009) 
 Richard Landon Literary forgeries & mystifications, Thomas Fisher Rare Book Library U. of Toronto, 2003, 
 Robin Myers Fakes and Frauds: Varieties of Deception In Print & Manuscript (New Castle: Oak Knoll Press 1996) 
 K. K. Ruthven Faking Literature Cambridge University Press (2001) 
 John Whitehead This Solemn Mockery: The Art of Literary Forgery (London: Arlington Books 1973) 
 Joseph Rosenblum Practice to Deceive: The Amazing Stories of Literary Forgery’s Most Notorious Practitioners (New Castle: Oak Knoll Press, 2000)

External links

 Books about literary forgery at About.com

 
False documents
Narratology